Canada participated in the 2004 Summer Paralympics in Athens, Greece. With 28 gold, 19 silver, and 25 bronze medals, the Canadian team placed third in the medal rankings, behind China and Great Britain. Wheelchair basketball player and three-time Paralympic gold medallist Chantal Benoit was the delegation's flag bearer at the opening ceremony.

Chantal Petitclerc ties the 5 gold medal record at a single Games for a Canadian, tying Stéphanie Dixon, who set the record at the 2000 Summer Paralympics.

Medallists

Competitors and results by event

Athletics

Men's track events

Men's field events

Women's track events

Women's field events

Boccia

Individual events

Pairs and team events

Cycling

Road

Track

Equestrian

Individual

Mixed team

Judo

Powerlifting

Sailing

Mixed 2.4mR class
Bruce Miller - 9th.

Mixed Sonar class
Brian MacDonald and Brian Mackie - 7th.

Shooting

Men

Women

Swimming

Men

Women

Wheelchair basketball

Men's team
The team consisted of 12 basketball players.
Patrick Anderson
Jaimie Borisoff
Brad Bowden
David Durepos
David Eng
Travis Gaertner
Roy Henderson
Joey Johnson
Adam Lancia
Ross Norton
Richard Peter
Chris Stoutenburg

Women's team
The team consisted of 12 basketball players.
Marni Abbott-Peter
Chantal Benoit
Tracey Ferguson
Shira Golden
Jennifer Krempien
Linda Kutrowski
Arley McNeney
Kendra Ohama
Danielle Peers
Sabrina Pettinicchi
Lori Radke
Karla Tritten

Wheelchair rugby

 * Semi-final game
 ** Gold medal final

Wheelchair tennis

Media coverage

See also
Canada at the 2004 Summer Olympics
Canada at the Paralympics

References 

Nations at the 2004 Summer Paralympics
2004
Paralympics